The 2010–11 Allen Americans season was the second season of the CHL franchise in Allen, Texas.

Regular season

Conference standings

Awards and records

Awards

Milestones

Transactions
The Americans were involved in the following transactions during the 2010–11 season.

Trades

Roster

|}

Affiliates
NHL - Dallas Stars
AHL - Texas Stars

See also
 2010–11 CHL season

References

External links
 2010–11 Allen Americans season at Pointstreak

A
A